Madia gracilis is a species of flowering plant in the family Asteraceae known by the common names grassy tarweed, slender tarweed, and gumweed madia.

Description
Madia gracilis is vstem is branching, and hairy and glandular in texture. The leaves are up to 10 centimeters long and covered in soft hairs and stalked resin glands.

The inflorescence is an array of clusters of flower heads. Each head is lined with phyllaries that are coated densely with stalked knobby resin glands. It bears yellow, lobe-tipped ray florets a few millimeters long and several black-anthered disc florets.

The fruit is a flat, hairless achene with no pappus.

Distribution and habitat
The annual herb is native to western North America: from British Columbia, through California to Baja California; and east to Utah and Montana. It grows in many habitat types except for arid desert areas, including oak woodlands and mixed evergreen forests.

Uses
The seeds were used to make pinole by the indigenous Mendocino, Miwok, and Pomo peoples of California.

References

External links

Calflora Database: Madia gracilis (Gumweed madia, grassy tarweed, slender tarweed)
Jepson Manual eFlora (TJM2) treatment of Madia gracilis
UC Photos gallery — Madia gracilis

gracilis
Flora of the Northwestern United States
Flora of California
Flora of Baja California
Flora of British Columbia
Flora of Nevada
Flora of Utah
Flora of the Cascade Range
Flora of the Great Basin
Flora of the Sierra Nevada (United States)
Natural history of the California chaparral and woodlands
Natural history of the California Coast Ranges
Natural history of the Peninsular Ranges
Natural history of the Transverse Ranges
Plants used in Native American cuisine
Flora without expected TNC conservation status